Disjunctivism is a position in the philosophy of perception that rejects the existence of sense data in certain cases. The disjunction is between appearance and the reality behind the appearance "making itself perceptually manifest to someone."

Veridical perceptions and hallucinations are not members of a common class of mental states or events.  According to this theory, the only thing common to veridical perceptions and hallucinations is that in both cases, the subject cannot tell, via introspection, whether he is having a veridical perception or not.  Disjunctivists claim this because they hold that in veridical perception, a subject's experience actually presents the external, mind-independent object of that perception.  Further, they claim that in a hallucination there is no external object to be related to, nor are there sense-data to be a part of the perception.  Thus, disjunctivism is a form of naive realism (also commonly known as direct realism).

Disjunctivism was first introduced to the contemporary literature by Michael Hinton, and has been most prominently associated with John McDowell. It has also been defended at length by Duncan Pritchard. Disjunctivists often hold that an important virtue of their view is that it captures the common sense idea that perception involves a relation to objects in the world.

Disjunctivism can be contrasted to the Triggered Hallucination Theory of perception, which holds that veridical perception and hallucination are the same thing, but differ only in aetiology.

References

External links
 
 

Philosophical realism
Perception
Theory of mind
Epistemological theories